Molyneux Brow railway station was a railway station built on the Manchester, Bury and Rossendale Railway line, between Radcliffe and Clifton (formerly Clifton Junction), in Greater Manchester.

History

The station was opened in June 1853, and was accessed from Philips Park Road. The station closed on 29 June 1931. The M60 motorway has removed any trace of this station.

See also 
 East Lancashire Railway 1844-1859

References

External links
Molyneux Brow Station on navigable 1948 O.S. map

Disused railway stations in the Metropolitan Borough of Bury
Former Lancashire and Yorkshire Railway stations
Railway stations in Great Britain opened in 1853
Railway stations in Great Britain closed in 1931